Valeri Armenovich Tsarukyan (born 12 November 2001) is a Russian football player of Armenian descent. He plays for FC Volgar Astrakhan on loan from FC Fakel Voronezh.

Club career
He made his debut in the Russian Football National League for FC Fakel Voronezh on 17 April 2021 in a game against PFC Krylia Sovetov Samara.

On 9 June 2022, Tsarukyan was loaned to FC Volgar Astrakhan.

References

External links
 Profile by Russian Football National League
 

2001 births
Sportspeople from Stavropol Krai
Russian people of Armenian descent
Living people
Russian footballers
Association football midfielders
FC Dynamo Stavropol players
FC Fakel Voronezh players
FC Volgar Astrakhan players
Russian First League players
Russian Second League players